Juan 'Jon' Remigio Cuyami Vaz (born 17 December 1972) is a Spanish-born Equatorial Guinean retired footballer who played as a forward. He has been a member of the senior Equatorial Guinea national team.

Club career
Born in San Sebastián, Gipuzkoa, Spain, Cuyami managed ten scoreless La Liga appearances for Real Sociedad after growing in its youth system. For the next 12 years, however, his career was spent in Segunda División B or lower (with the exception of Recreativo de Huelva and Burgos CF in Segunda División, clubs which he helped promote).

In 2004, Cuyami returned to the Basque Country for his final three seasons, with SD Lemona and Zarautz KE, the latter in the regional championships. Shortly after, he rejoined to Real Sociedad as part of its indoor soccer team.

International career
As Javier Balboa, Rodolfo Bodipo or Benjamín Zarandona, Cuyami was the son of Equatoguinean immigrants in Spain, and opted to represent his parents' nation internationally. His debut came on 11 October 2003 in a 1–0 win against Togo for the 2006 FIFA World Cup qualifiers (eventual 1–2 aggregate loss), in Bata.

Cuyami won a total of two caps, the second coming also that year in a friendly with São Tomé and Príncipe.

References

External links

Worldfootball profile

1972 births
Living people
Spanish sportspeople of Equatoguinean descent
Citizens of Equatorial Guinea through descent
Spanish footballers
Equatoguinean footballers
Footballers from San Sebastián
Association football forwards
La Liga players
Segunda División players
Segunda División B players
Real Sociedad B footballers
Real Sociedad footballers
UE Figueres footballers
CP Almería players
Recreativo de Huelva players
AD Ceuta footballers
Burgos CF footballers
CE Sabadell FC footballers
CF Palencia footballers
SD Lemona footballers
Equatorial Guinea international footballers